Located on the suburbs of Srinagar, Vichar Nag is a locality that gets its name from an ancient Shiva temple. Famous Anchar Lake is close to this. Vichar Nag is mentioned several times in the history of Kashmir, including the famous 'Rajtaragni' by Kalhan.

Vichar Nag Temple 
Vichar Nag has spring and two old Shiva temples.

History
Vichar Nag was seat of discussion (hence the name, Vichar) and it was in this temple that Kashmiri Brahmins used to discuss Panchang. It is said Jagat Guru Shankaracharya also visited this temple for discussion.

Kashmir has been always a seat of learning and it is believed that The 2nd Fourth Buddhist Council (Sarvastivada tradition) is said to have been convened by the Kushan emperor Kanishka (r. 127-151 CE), perhaps in 78 CE at Vichar Nag in Kashmir.

Before 1990, on Chaitra Amavasiya, the last day of Kashmiri calendar, a festival was celebrated at this place. On this day, devotees used to take a bath in the holy spring and there after performed puja in the Shiva Temple known as ‘Vichar Saheb’.

Architecture
One temple is made of chiselled and dressed devri stones. There are two springs with the main big spring as the centre of attraction and sanctity. The spring has a length of 430 feet and breadth of 35 feet. Big sized ‘Devri’ stones have been used for construction of stairs to the spring on the west and south sides. There is no access on north and east sides.

In the middle of the spring there is a stone cylinder of about 3 feet height with a Shivalingam resting on it. Before the exodus of Kashmir Pandits in 1990 the water from the spring used to come out in the shape of a small brook, joining the other brook called ‘Mukhta Pukhri'. After covering a sizeable distance the water used to flow into Lake Anchar.

Current situation 
Till early 1990s from the time immemorial, the spring water contained many fish. The other feature of the spring is that the water turns ice cold in summer and lukewarm in winter.

The 1990s saw the exodus of almost all the Hindus of Vicharnag and the temple went into disrepair due to lack of maintenance.  In the vicinity of Vichar Nag, there were many springs earlier, which have been lost over the time, largely due to encroachments by the local population.

References
3.The Temple is not used for any  burial mentioned by Wright, Colin. This information is baseless.
Srinagar